Miltochrista sauteri is a moth of the family Erebidae. It was described by Strand in 1917. It is found in Taiwan.

References

 Natural History Museum Lepidoptera generic names catalog

sauteri
Moths described in 1917
Moths of Taiwan